Ronald Vandewal (born 8 June 1946) is a Belgian volleyball player. He competed in the men's tournament at the 1968 Summer Olympics.

References

1946 births
Living people
Belgian men's volleyball players
Olympic volleyball players of Belgium
Volleyball players at the 1968 Summer Olympics
Sportspeople from Antwerp